The Judea and Samaria Area is an administrative division of Israel. It encompasses the entire West Bank, which has been occupied by Israel since 1967, but excludes East Jerusalem (see Jerusalem Law). Its area is split into 165 Palestinian "islands" that are under total or partial civil administration by the Palestinian National Authority (PNA), and a contiguous area containing 230 Israeli settlements into which Israeli law is "pipelined".

While its area is internationally recognized as a part of the Palestinian territories, some Israeli authorities group it together with the districts of Israel proper, largely for statistical purposes. The term Judea and Samaria serves as another name for the West Bank in Israel.

Terminology

Biblical significance 
The Judea and Samaria Area covers a portion of the territory designated by the biblical names of Judea and Samaria. Both names are tied to the ancient Israelite kingdoms: the former corresponds to part of the Kingdom of Judah, also known as the Southern Kingdom; and the latter corresponds to part of the Kingdom of Samaria, also known as the Northern Kingdom. In 1947, the terminology was noted by the United Nations in the Partition Plan for Palestine with the statement: "the boundary of the hill country of Samaria and Judea starts on the Jordan River..."

1967 Arab–Israeli War 
In 1967, the Six-Day War saw Israeli forces capture the Jordanian-annexed West Bank, marking the beginning of the ongoing Israeli occupation of the territory. Following its capture, the right-wing Israelis began to refer to the territories by their Hebrew-language names and argued for their integration into Israel on historical, religious, nationalist, and security grounds. In December 1967, the Israeli Military Governorate issued an order that stated: "the term 'Judea and Samaria region' shall be identical in meaning for all purposes to the term 'the West Bank Region. By early 1968, "Judea and Samaria" had been formally adopted in official usage. However, the phrase was rarely used until 1977, when Menachem Begin, a proponent of extending Israel's sovereignty to the region, was elected as Israel's sixth prime minister.

The name Judea, when used in Judea and Samaria, refers to all of the area to the south of Jerusalem, including Gush Etzion and Har Hevron. The name Samaria, on the other hand, refers to all of the area to the north of Jerusalem. In 1980, East Jerusalem (a part of the West Bank) was effectively annexed by Israel and has since been under civilian administration; it is thus excluded from the administrative structure of the Judea and Samaria Area.
  
The names "West Bank" or, alternatively, "the Territories" are also current in Israeli usage. Generally, preference for one term over the other indicates the speaker's position on the Israeli political spectrum. Left-wingers, who take the view that the territory should be evacuated under a peace agreement, prefer "West Bank"; conversely, right-wingers, who take the view that the territory should come under Israeli administration permanently, advocate the usage of "Judea and Samaria".

Status 

The Judea and Samaria Area is administered by the Israel Defense Forces Central Command, and military law is applied. Administrative decisions are subject to the Command's chief. The incumbent chief of Central Command is Aluf Nitzan Alon.

The future status of the region is a key factor in the ongoing Israeli–Palestinian conflict.
 
United Nations Security Council Resolution 242, adopted in November 1967, after Israel captured the region from Jordan in the Six-Day War, lists as its first principle "the inadmissibility of the acquisition of territory by war and the need to work for a just and lasting peace in which every State in the area can live in security" and called for the "withdrawal of Israel armed forces from territories occupied in the recent conflict" in conjunction with the "termination of all claims or states of belligerency and respect for and acknowledgment of the sovereignty, territorial integrity and political independence of every State in the area and their right to live in peace within secure and recognized boundaries free from threats or acts of force".

The West Bank (including East Jerusalem) and Gaza Strip are considered occupied Palestinian territories by the United Nations, the United States, the International Court of Justice, the European Union, and by non-governmental organizations such as Amnesty International, Human Rights Watch, and B'Tselem. The Supreme Court of Israel has considered the section of the West Bank which excludes East Jerusalem to be Israeli-occupied territories.

On 13 May 2012, a bill to extend Israeli law to the Israeli settlements in the Judea and Samaria Area initiated by Knesset member Miri Regev (Likud) first approved by the majority of the Ministerial Committee for Legislation was rejected in a second round of votes after prime minister Benjamin Netanyahu had instructed his ministers to vote against the bill. Extending Israeli law to the settlements would mean a de facto annexation of the settlements to Israel. In July 2012, a government-commissioned report from a three-member committee, called Levy Report, asserted, based on a number of reasons, that there is no legal basis under international law to refer to Judea and Samaria as "occupied territory". Article 43 of the Fourth Hague Convention of 1907 is the basis of the Levy committee's opinion.

Administrative local authorities
The area is further divided into eight military administrative regions: Menashe (Jenin area), HaBik'a (Jordan Valley), Shomron (Shechem area, known in Arabic as Nablus), Efrayim (Tulkarm area), Binyamin (Ramallah/al-Bireh area), Maccabim (Maccabim area), Etzion (Bethlehem area) and Yehuda (Hebron area).

Israeli settlements

See also
 West Bank, the internationally used name for Israel's Judea and Samaria Area
 State of Judea, a proposed Halakhic state in the West Bank
 Israeli Civil Administration, the Israeli governing body in parts of the West Bank
 List of burial places of Abrahamic figures

Notes

References

External links

 Civil Administration in Judea and Samaria at the COGAT website
 "The Territories": Part 1, Part 2. Jewish Agency for Israel
 

 
1967 establishments in Israel
States and territories established in 1967
Israeli occupation of the West Bank
Geographical naming disputes
Geography of the West Bank